FuseNet is an educational organization funded by the European Union focused on fusion.

The FP7 Project 
The purpose of FuseNet is to coordinate and facilitate fusion education, to share best practices, to jointly develop educational tools, to organize educational events. The members of FuseNet have jointly established academic criteria for the award of European Fusion Doctorate and Master Certificates. These criteria are set to stimulate a high level of fusion education throughout Europe.

The Association 
FuseNet is the umbrella organization and single voice for the training and education of the next generation fusion engineers and scientists. FuseNet is recognized as such by the European Commission.

References

External links 
 FuseNet Website

Nuclear fusion
Science education